Packages Limited is a Pakistani multinational packaging company with its head office based in Lahore, Pakistan. The company was founded in 1956. It is a public limited company incorporated in Pakistan. It is principally engaged in the manufacture and sale of packaging materials and tissue products. The company also holds investments in many companies.

The company is listed on the Pakistan Stock Exchange.

History
Packages Limited was founded in 1956 as a joint venture between Ali Group of Pakistan and Akerlund & Rausing of Sweden.

Companies
The group owns the following companies:
 Packages Convertors Limited
 Bulleh Shah Packaging Pvt. Ltd
 Tri-Pack Films Limited
 DIC Pakistan Limited
 OmyaPack
 StarchPack 
 Packages Lanka Pvt. Ltd. (Sri Lanka)
 Flexible Packages Convertors (South Africa)
 Chantler Packages (Canada)
 Packages Power
 Packages Mall
 IGl Holdings Limited
 IGI General Insurance Limited
 IGI Investments Pvt Limited
 IGl Life Insurance Limited
 IGI Securities
 IGI FSI

External links 
 Packages Limited on Pakistan Stock Exchange 
 Detailed Financial Reports of Packages Limited

References

Pakistani brands
Manufacturing companies established in 1956
Conglomerate companies of Pakistan
Packaging companies of Pakistan
Companies based in Lahore
Companies listed on the Pakistan Stock Exchange
Ali family
Multinational companies headquartered in Pakistan
Pakistani companies established in 1956